Marc Sneyd (born 9 February 1991) is an English professional rugby league footballer who plays as a  for Salford Red Devils in the Betfred Super League and England at international level.

He made over 160 Super League appearances for Hull F.C., and also previously spent a season on loan from Salford at the Castleford Tigers (Heritage № 942) in the Super League.

Background
Sneyd was born in Oldham, Greater Manchester, England, and grew up in Shaw.

Club career

Salford
He came through the junior ranks at Salford. He made his début for Salford in 2010 but his game time was limited. In May 2013, he signed a new two-year contract with Salford.

Castleford
Sneyd joined Castleford Tigers on loan for the 2014 season. Castleford coach Daryl Powell described him as "...a quality player with the added benefit of an outstanding left-foot kicking game.” This was Sneyd's breakthrough season in which he scored 7 tries and kicked 117 goals in just 31 appearances, and appeared in the 2014 Challenge Cup Final defeat by the Leeds Rhinos at Wembley Stadium.

Hull F.C.
A transfer request in June 2014 was turned down by Salford, but soon after, Sneyd signed a three-year contract with Hull F.C. Hull coach Lee Radford said he "...has a superb left-foot kicking game and a fantastic touch on the ball, which we think will give him the opportunity to blossom into a really good young British half-back."

In 2016, Sneyd kicked 130 goals and became the league's top goal-kicker.  He won the 2016 Challenge Cup with Hull against the Warrington Wolves, kicking two goals in the narrow 12-10 win at Wembley Stadium; Sneyd was made man-of-the-match and won the prestigious Lance Todd Trophy.

In February 2017, he extended his contract with Hull until 2019. He won the 2017 Challenge Cup with Hull in an 18-14 victory over the record holders Wigan Warriors, and once again he was named the Lance Todd Trophy winner becoming only the second player to win the award two years in a row. 

In April 2019, Sneyd signed a new three-year contract until the end of the 2022 season.

In April 2021, Sneyd overtook Michael Dobson in 9th position for the most conversions and penalty goals in Super League history.

Salford
On 5 November 2021, Sneyd signed a three-year deal to join Salford beginning in the 2022 season.
In round 3 of the 2022 Super League season, Sneyd was sent to the sin bin in his return game against Hull F.C. which ended in a 48-16 loss at the MKM Stadium.
In round 26 of the 2022 Super League season, Sneyd scored two tries and kicked nine goals in Salford's 50-10 victory over Castleford.

International career
In October 2013, he was named in the Ireland squad for the 2013 Rugby League World Cup. However, despite being eligible through lineage, he was ruled ineligible after failing to complete the paperwork in time to register for the 2013 tournament.
Sneyd made his England debut in the 2021 Rugby League World Cup match against France in Bolton on 22 October 2022, kicking seven goals in England's 42-18 victory.
In the third group stage match, Sneyd scored a try and kicked 13 goals in England's 94-4 victory over Greece.

Honours

Club
Challenge Cup: (2) 2016, 2017
Runner-up: (1) 2014

Individual
Lance Todd Trophy: (2) 2016, 2017

References

External links

Hull FC profile
SL profile
England profile

1991 births
Living people
Castleford Tigers players
 England national rugby league team players
English rugby league players
Hull F.C. players
Lance Todd Trophy winners
Rugby league five-eighths
Rugby league fullbacks
Rugby league halfbacks
Rugby league players from Oldham
Salford Red Devils players